James Pettifer is a British academic, author and journalist who has specialised in Balkan affairs.

He was born in 1949 in Hereford and was educated at King's School, Worcester, and Hertford College, Oxford.

Pettifer has travelled extensively in Greece, Turkey and the Balkans and he has written several tourist guides to the region, including the Blue Guide to Albania and Kosovo, one of the few such guides to the area. In the media, he has  reported mainly for The Times and The Wall Street Journal and he is a regular broadcaster and commentator on the Balkan countries on both radio and television.

His expertise has been employed academically. He was a Senior Associate Member of St Antony's College, Oxford, and a Visiting Professor in the Institute of Balkan Studies, in Thessaloniki. He is currently teaching Balkan history at the Oxford University Faculty of History.

Works
Pettifer's published work includes:
Turkish Labyrinth (Viking, 1997) 
Blue Guide Bulgaria (A & C Black, 1998) 
The New Macedonian Question (Springer, 1999) 
The Greeks: The Land and People Since the War (Penguin, 2000). 
Albania: From Anarchy to a Balkan Identity (with Miranda Vickers; NYU Press, 2000). 
Blue Guide Albania and Kosovo (A & C Black, 2000). 
Kosova Express: A Journey in Wartime (University of Wisconsin Press, 2005) 
The Albanian Question: Reshaping the Balkans (with Miranda Vickers; I.B. Tauris, 2009). 
The Making of the Greek Crisis (Penguing, 2012). 
The Kosova Liberation Army  Underground War to Balkan Insurgency, 1948–2001 (Hurst & Company, 2012). 
Lakes and Empires in Macedonian History: Contesting the Waters (with Miranda Vickers; Bloomsbury Publishing, 2021) 

He has published many papers in academic and other journals, a selection of which is available on his website.

References

External links
 Professor James Pettifer's Official website
 United Kingdom Defence Academy website
 Chatham House website

English non-fiction writers
English male journalists
People from Hereford
Academics of the University of Oxford
People educated at King's School, Worcester
Alumni of Hertford College, Oxford
Living people
1949 births
English male non-fiction writers
Chatham House people